Noel Mugavin (born 28 June 1956 in Warrnambool) is a former Australian rules footballer who played with Fitzroy and Richmond in the Victorian Football League (VFL).

Mugavin starred as a junior, catching the eyes of VFL scouts at an early age. His flowing locks became a trademark throughout his famous career to complement his silky skills.

Mugavin's career was cut short when he suffered a spleen injury in 1982, prompting him to retire from the highest level. Mugavin returned to the Hampden Football League in a coaching role.

He currently coaches players at South Warrnambool Football Club, and teaches students at Emmanuel College Warrnambool. He is also currently involved with greyhound racing.

His nephew is Brisbane Lions centre half forward Jonathan Brown and his youngest son Jamie, plies his trade at an amateur level in Melbourne.

References

External links 
 

1956 births
Living people
Fitzroy Football Club players
Richmond Football Club players
Port Fairy Football Club players
South Warrnambool Football Club coaches
Australian rules footballers from Victoria (Australia)
People from Warrnambool